is a town in Nordland county, Norway. The town is also the administrative centre of the municipality of Vestvågøy (with 10,764 inhabitants, it is the most populous municipality in Lofoten and Vesterålen). Leknes was designated a "town" in 2002.

The town is situated in the geographical middle of the Lofoten archipelago on the island of Vestvågøya. Leknes is one of the few towns in Lofoten that does not depend on fisheries and does not have its town centre by the sea. Because of this, and because of its rapid growth in recent years, it does not have the same traditional wooden architecture as most other towns in Lofoten, and may thus not be as picturesque as its neighbouring fishing villages. However, the natural surroundings are among the most stunning in Norway, with mountains, peaks, cliffs, and white sandy beaches.

The town's harbour Leknes Havn is one of Norway's most important and visited harbours for cruise ships. The old school in the Fygle neighborhood has been converted into a museum. Hol Church is located on the eastern edge of the town. Leknes is a "twin town" with nearby village of Gravdal, where one branch of the Nordland Hospital is located. In Leknes, the sun (midnight sun) is above the horizon from May 26 to July 17, and in winter the sun does not rise from December 9 to January 4.

Transportation
Leknes is the trading and shopping centre of Lofoten, only rivaled by Svolvær.  The European route E10 highway runs through the town connecting all the main islands of Lofoten to the mainland.  Leknes also has an airport, Leknes Airport, for regional aircraft, with 7 daily scheduled flights to Bodø and 1 daily flight to Tromsø with the airline Widerøe. The town has a small bus terminal that is a hub with bus links to the rest of Lofoten.

Climate
The weather station is located at the small Leknes Airport. Winters get abundant precipitation in Leknes. Summers are much drier with only 25 % of the winter precipitation. The weather station started up in 1972; records available since 2002.

Media
, the newspaper Lofot-Tidende had been published in Leknes since 1987.

References

Vestvågøy
Cities and towns in Norway
Populated places in Nordland
Populated places of Arctic Norway